Ctenolepisma terebrans is a species of silverfish in the family Lepismatidae.

Subspecies
These two subspecies belong to the species Ctenolepisma terebrans:
 Ctenolepisma terebrans pluriseta Silvestri, 1908
 Ctenolepisma terebrans terebrans

References

Further reading

 

Lepismatidae
Articles created by Qbugbot
Insects described in 1908